Knox United Church may refer to:

in Canada
Alberta
Knox United Church (Calgary)
Ontario
Knox United Church (Ottawa)
Knox United Church (Scarborough)
Saskatchewan
Knox United Church (Saskatoon)

in the Philippines
Knox United Methodist Church